Lakewood is a community comprising three neighbourhoods within the west-central portion of Mill Woods in the City of Edmonton, Alberta, Canada. Neighbourhoods within the community include Kameyosek, Meyonohk and Tipaskan. 

The community is represented by the Lakewood Community League, established in 1978, which maintains a community hall located at Lakewood Road East and 31 Avenue.

Lakewood Transit Centre 

The Lakewood Transit Centre, opened in 1982, is located at the South-West side of the neighborhood on Mill Woods Road and 28 avenue. There are no amenities available at this transit centre (no park & ride, drop off areas, washrooms, vending machines, etc...).

Approximately $1.4 million in upgrades to the transit centre were completed in 2017 with $689 thousand in funding provided by the federal government and $344.5 thousand in funding provided by the provincial government.

Following the April 25, 2021 bus network redesign, it is no longer indicated as a transit centre on ETS maps.  It is, however, still served by ETS bus routes.  The following bus routes serve the transit centre:

See also 
 Edmonton Federation of Community Leagues
 Edmonton Transit Service

References 

Neighbourhoods in Edmonton
Edmonton Transit Service transit centres